Shaun Evans may refer to:

Shaun Evans (born 1980), English actor, best known for Endeavour (2012–2023)
Shaun Evans (referee) (born 1987), Australian soccer referee
Shaun Evans (rugby union) (born 1996), Welsh rugby union player
Shaun Evans (One Life to Live), a fictional character on the ABC soap opera One Life to Live

See also
Shawn Evans (disambiguation)
Sean Evans (disambiguation)
Evans (surname)